The Philippines participated in the 21st Southeast Asian Games held in Kuala Lumpur, Malaysia from 8 to 17 September 2001.

SEA Games performance
The Philippines' 30-gold medal harvest was nine better than what it got in the 1999 edition in Brunei. Despite the country's fifth-place finish, Philippine Olympic Committee president Celso Dayrit praised the Filipino athletes. The nationals saw action in 29 events.

Medalists

Gold

Silver

Bronze

Multiple

Medal summary

By sports

References

External links
 Results

Southeast Asian Games
Nations at the 2001 Southeast Asian Games
2001